Frederik Johan van Baer, Lord of Slangenburg (27 July 1645 – 15 December 1713) was a Dutch officer in the military service of William III of Orange.

Career
He was a professed Catholic, and therefore was denied a career in government. A career in the army was the obvious choice.
Overcoming the challenges posed by his faith, he had a distinguished career in the Dutch Army, participating in the War of the Grand Alliance and the War of the Spanish Succession.  In 1675 he was the colonel of one of the Dutch-Scottish regiments. He became major general in 1683, lieutenant-general in 1692 and general in 1704. In 1689 he commanded troops at the Battle of Walcourt. In 1703 he rescued a desperate situation at the Battle of Ekeren. Slangenburg's relations with the Duke of Marlborough were not good, which in 1705 led to his removal from his post and replacement by Ouwerkerk, who had a far better personal relationship with Marlborough.

Van Baer rebuild his ancestral mansion the "Slangenburg" near Doetinchem into a considerable castle, fitting his status. His wife is memorialized in many paintings there by Gerard Hoet.

Family
He was the son of Herman van Baer van Slangenburg (1610–1653) and Catharina van Voorst (1620–1678). In 1665 he married Dorothea Petronella van Steenbergen, who died the same year. Frederik never remarried.

External links 
 Slangenburg Castle today

1645 births
1713 deaths
Dutch army commanders in the War of the Spanish Succession
Dutch military commanders
People from Doetinchem
Dutch military personnel of the Nine Years' War
17th-century Dutch military personnel
Dutch generals
18th-century Dutch military personnel